Los Cazadores: Primera Busqueda is a compilation album released by Sony BMG on February 22, 2005. The album features several artists from the reggaetón genre, such as Tito "El Bambino", Tego Calderón, Yaga & Mackie, Zion & Lennox, Nicky Jam, Ivy Queen, Notch, La  Jomar, Pedro Prez, Gammy, Rey Pirin, Guanabanas, Andy Boy, Maicol & Manuel and Dominic.

Production of the album was handled by DJ Adam, DJ Blass, DJ Jan, Maestro, DJ Majestic, Rafi Mercenario, Monserrate, Mr. G, DJ Sonic and Sosa. Upon release, the album peaked at number eight on the Billboard Latin Albums chart, number three on the Billboard Tropical Albums chart, and number two on the Billboard Reggae Albums chart.

Los Cazadores: Primera Busqueda spawned one single, "La Cazadora" performed by Tito "El Bambino". It reached number thirty-eight on the Billboard Latin Songs chart and number eight on the Billboard Tropical Songs chart. Due to the album's commercial success, a sequel was issued in 2006 entitled Los Cazadores 2: Segunda Busqueda.

Background and composition
Prior to the album's release, many of the featured artist had already established themselves as some of the best in the genre. Tito "El Bambino" had made a name for himself while apart of the duo Hector & Tito. Before splitting in 2003, the duo won a Latin Billboard Music Award for "Latin Rap Album of the Year" for their 2002 effort A La Reconquista.

Tego Calderón, referred to by David Jeffries as "one of the foremost ambassadors of the reggaetón genre", had debuted with El Abayarde in 2003. The album was a commercial success managing 50,000 copies in its first month. In 2004, he followed the album up with El Enemy De Los Guasíbiri, "a punchier, more hectic, more street-level affair".

Yaga & Mackie formed in 2001 and appeared on various compilation albums before releasing their debut album Sonando Diferente (2002). Zion & Lennox, as a duo, released one studio album, Motivando a la Yal (2004). The album peaked at number thirty-two and number thirteen on the Billboard Latin Albums and Billboard Latin Pop Albums, respectively. The special edition re-release proved more successful, reaching number ten on the Billboard Latin Albums chart. The album was well received by critics, with Evan Gutierrez of AllMusic calling it a "landmark album" and "one of the albums that artists will refer to in years to come as one of the records that shaped reggaeton and its future".

Nicky Jam became known by appearing on various mixtapes from the 1990s. His popularity then proved itself when we released his second studio album Vida Escante (2004) which reached a mainstream audience. Ivy Queen had established herself as the top female artist in reggaetón. In 2003, Ivy Queen released Diva, her third studio album. It was considered to have been important for exposing reggaetón to a mainstream audience in 2004.<ref>Carney Smith, Jessie. [https://books.google.com/books?id=10rEGSIItjgC&q=Ivy+Queen+Diva%27%27Encyclopedia&pg=PA1199 of African American Popular Culture]. ABC-CLIO, 2010, p. 1199.</ref> After the success of the albumwhich was certified platinum by the RIAA, Ivy Queen released a platinum edition of Diva in 2004. The platinum edition was nominated for "Reggaeton Album of the Year" at the 2005 Billboard Latin Music Awards. It was followed by her fourth studio album, Real (2004), which was too a success.

Chart performance
Upon release, the album debuted at number eight on the Billboard Top Latin Albums chart for the week of March 12, 2005, becoming that week's "Hot Shot Debut". On the Billboard Tropical Albums chart, it debuted at number three behind Daddy Yankee's Barrio Fino (2004) and Chosen Few: El Documental (2005) presented by Pina Records, for the week of March 12, 2005. It debuted at number two on the Billboard Reggae Albums chart, behind Chosen Few: El Documental for the week of March 12, 2005. Los Cazadores also managed to debut at number fourteen on the Billboard Compilation Albums chart for the week of March 12, 2005.

The album's lead single, "La Cazadora", was released to radio stations in February 2005. On the Billboard Latin Songs chart, it peaked at number 38 for the week of January 21, 2006. It peaked at number 16 on the Billboard Latin Rhythm Songs chart, for the week of November 26, 2005. On the Billboard Tropical Songs chart, the song peaked at number eight, for the week of December 17, 2005.

Reception

An editor for AllMusic gave the album three and a half stars out of five and selected Tito "El Bambino"'s "La Cazadora", Tego Calderón and Voltio's "De Norte A Sur", Ivy Queen's "Dale Pai" and DJ Majestic's remix of "De Norte A Sur" as album highlights.

According to an editor from Metropolis'', Japan's number one English-language magazine, the album "launches in full bore with the blazing beats of Tito El Bambino’s "La Cazadora" and doesn't let up through 19 tracks of rumbustious beats, macho boasts and lyrical leers."

The Megaton Awards are presented annually by the SBS Reggaetón Network, composed of the American radio stations "Reggaeton 94.FM", "mega 97.9FM", "El Sol 95.7FM", and "Latino 96.3FM" in the United States. At the 2005 installment of the awards ceremony, the album was nominated for “Reggaetón Compilation Album of the Year”.

Track listing

Credits and personnel
Adapted from the album's liner notes.

Andy Boy – Featured Artist
Tego Calderón – Featured Artist
Holly Chen – Creative Design
DJ Adam – Musical Production
DJ Blass – Musical Production
DJ Majestic – Editing, Mixing, Musical Production
DJ Sonic – Musical Production
Dominic – Featured Artist
Gran Omar – Executive Production: “Dale Pai”
Guanabanas – Featured Artist
Ivy Queen – Featured Artist, Executive Production: “Dale Pai”
Nicky Jam – Featured Artist
Jomar – Featured Artist
Maicol & Manuel – Featured Artists
Mr. G – Musical Production
Notch – Featured Artist
Pedro Prez – Featured Artist
Platinum Entertainment – Record Label
Esteban Piñero – Mastering
Rafi Mercenario – Musical Production
Sony Discos – Manufacture, Distribution
Sosa – Musical Production
Tito “El Bambino” – Featured Artist
Yaga & Mackie – Featured Artists
Zion & Lennox – Featured Artists

Charts

Release history

References

2005 compilation albums
Spanish-language compilation albums
Reggaeton compilation albums
Sony BMG Norte albums
Albums produced by Ivy Queen
Albums produced by Rafy Mercenario